A non-inertial reference frame is a frame of reference that undergoes acceleration with respect to an inertial frame. An accelerometer at rest in a non-inertial frame will, in general, detect a non-zero acceleration. While the laws of motion are the same in all inertial frames, in non-inertial frames, they vary from frame to frame depending on the acceleration.

In classical mechanics the motion of bodies in non-inertial reference frames is modeled by introducing additional forces (d'Alembert forces) to inertial reference frames in order to account for the inertia effects that are appearing in this situation. Because in principle they don't belong to the modeling of an inertial frame in terms of Newton's second law such inertial effects are called fictitious forces. They might be called inertial forces or pseudo forces, too.  Common examples of this include the Coriolis force and the centrifugal force. 

In general, the expression for any fictitious force can be derived from the acceleration of the non-inertial frame. 

As stated by Goodman and Warner, "One might say that F  ma holds in any coordinate system provided the term 'force' is redefined to include the so-called 'reversed effective forces' or 'inertia forces'."

In the theory of general relativity, the curvature of spacetime causes frames to be locally inertial, but globally non-inertial. Due to the non-Euclidean geometry of curved space-time, there are no global inertial reference frames in general relativity. More specifically, the fictitious force which appears in general relativity is the force of gravity.

Avoiding fictitious forces in calculations

In flat spacetime, the use of non-inertial frames can be avoided if desired.  Measurements with respect to non-inertial reference frames can always be transformed to an inertial frame, incorporating directly the acceleration of the non-inertial frame as that acceleration as seen from the inertial frame. This approach avoids use of fictitious forces (it is based on an inertial frame, where fictitious forces are absent, by definition) but it may be less convenient from an intuitive, observational, and even a calculational viewpoint. As pointed out by Ryder for the case of rotating frames as used in meteorology:

Detection of a non-inertial frame: need for fictitious forces
That a given frame is non-inertial can be detected by its need for fictitious forces to explain observed motions. For example, the rotation of the Earth can be observed using a Foucault pendulum.  The rotation of the Earth seemingly causes the pendulum to change its plane of oscillation because the surroundings of the pendulum move with the Earth. As seen from an Earth-bound (non-inertial) frame of reference, the explanation of this apparent change in orientation  requires the introduction of the fictitious Coriolis force.

Another famous example is that of the tension in the string between two spheres rotating about each other. In that case, prediction of the measured tension in the string based upon the motion of the spheres as observed from a rotating reference frame requires the rotating observers to introduce a fictitious centrifugal force.

In this connection, it may be noted that a change in coordinate system, for example, from Cartesian to polar, if implemented without any change in relative motion, does not cause the appearance of fictitious forces, despite the fact that the form of the laws of motion varies from one type of curvilinear coordinate system to another.

Fictitious forces in curvilinear coordinates

A different use of the term "fictitious force" often is used in curvilinear coordinates, particularly polar coordinates. To avoid confusion, this distracting ambiguity in terminologies is pointed out here. These so-called "forces" are non-zero in all frames of reference, inertial or non-inertial, and do not transform as vectors under rotations and translations of the coordinates (as all Newtonian forces do, fictitious or otherwise).

This incompatible use of the term "fictitious force" is unrelated to non-inertial frames. These so-called "forces" are defined by determining the acceleration of a particle within the curvilinear coordinate system, and then separating the simple double-time derivatives of coordinates from the remaining terms. These remaining terms then are called "fictitious forces". More careful usage calls these terms "generalized fictitious forces" to indicate their connection to the generalized coordinates of Lagrangian mechanics. The application of Lagrangian methods to polar coordinates can be found here.

Relativistic point of view

Frames and flat spacetime

If a region of spacetime is declared to be Euclidean, and effectively free from obvious gravitational fields, then if an accelerated coordinate system is overlaid onto the same region, it can be said that a uniform fictitious field exists in the accelerated frame (we reserve the word gravitational for the case in which a mass is involved). An object accelerated to be stationary in the accelerated frame will "feel" the presence of the field, and they will also be able to see environmental matter with inertial states of motion (stars, galaxies, etc.) to be apparently falling "downwards" in the field along curved trajectories as if the field is real.

In frame-based descriptions, this supposed field can be made to appear or disappear by switching between "accelerated" and "inertial" coordinate systems.

More advanced descriptions
As the situation is modeled in finer detail, using the general principle of relativity, the concept of a frame-dependent gravitational field becomes less realistic. In these Machian models, the accelerated body can agree that the apparent gravitational field is associated with the motion of the background matter, but can also claim that the motion of the material as if there is a gravitational field, causes the gravitational field - the accelerating background matter "drags light". Similarly, a background observer can argue that the forced acceleration of the mass causes an apparent gravitational field in the region between it and the environmental material (the accelerated mass also "drags light").
This "mutual" effect, and the ability of an accelerated mass to warp lightbeam geometry and lightbeam-based coordinate systems, is referred to as frame-dragging.

Frame-dragging removes the usual distinction between accelerated frames (which show gravitational effects) and inertial frames (where the geometry is supposedly free from gravitational fields). When a forcibly-accelerated body physically "drags" a coordinate system, the problem becomes an exercise in warped spacetime for all observers.

See also
Rotating reference frame
Fictitious force
Centrifugal force
Coriolis effect
Inertial frame of reference
Free motion equation

References and notes

Frames of reference
Classical mechanics